The Harmonies are a five-piece girlband formed in 2010, with the finalists of a competition with over 200,000 contestants organised by the Women's Institute and announced in February 2010, to create an album in celebration of the 95th anniversary of the WI.

Music career

2010-present: Voices of the W.I.
The line-up of the band was announced on 16 September 2010, with the group signing a £1 million recording contract with Universal Music. In order to promote the album, which was released on 25 October 2010, the group have appeared on many high-profile UK TV shows including Daybreak, This Morning, QVC and The One Show, among others. They have also performed at Prince Charles' "A Garden Party with a Difference" at St James's Palace, and a national arena tour in early 2011. The album entered the midweek charts at number 14 and dropped to number forty-two after its first week in the UK Singles Chart through lack of availability due to distribution issues, and then dropped out completely by its second week.

Discography

Albums

References

External links
Official website

Musical groups established in 2010
Musical quintets
Universal Music Group artists
British pop girl groups
2010 establishments in England